ANME can mean:

 anaerobic methanotroph, a type of microorganism associated with the anaerobic oxidation of methane
 Asociación Nacional de Mujeres Españolas, a Spanish feminist organization